Robert Nolan is an English-speaking Canadian actor working in the region of Toronto. He is mainly known in the world of web series, to be Steven LeMay, one of the main roles of many-times-awarded LGBT webseries, Out With Dad (Seasons 1 & 2) .
In 2014 Nolan portrayed the character of Warren Gabriel in Director Jeffrey W. Pike's short film Playground Rules which was screened internationally to a warm audience reception that citied Nolan's performance convincing as a intimidating and money hungry CEO.

Filmography

Cinema

Movies 
 1991 - Tiger Claws : Roberts
 2009 - The Red Pearl
 2010 - Severance : Tom Braddock
 2011 - Lucky 7 : Brian 
 2011 - Searching for Angels : Doctor
 2011 - Night Express 2012 - Skeleton Lake : Logan 
 2012 - Sick : Mckay Jacobs 
 2012 - The Prospector's Curse : The Prospector 
 2013 - Antisocial : Priest
 2013 - Mourning Has Broken : Husband
 2013 - Silent Retreat : Doctor
 2014 - Tension(s) : Karl Fisher 
 2014 - Berkshire County :  Glen Harrison 
 2014 - Late Night Double Feature : Night Clown
 2015 - Canswer : Cillian

 Short movies 

 2006 - The Universal Hanging Together of all Things : Deusecks 
 2006 - Nothing Shocks Anyone Anymore : Gambler
 2007 - The Restore : The Politician
 2007 - Please Stand By... : PSA Host 
 2007 - Scalped : Ned 
 2007 - The Good Son : Agent Davidson 
 2007 - Lost Little Girl : The Suspect
 2008 - Title Match : Dr. Campbell 
 2008 - Rescue : Boss
 2008 - Kill Your Television : Doctor 
 2008 - Hard Time : Mr. Tick 
 2008 - Coldplay: Lost? : French Imperial Guard #1 
 2008 - Scent of Rosemary : Lawrence 
 2009 - Homeless Yoga : Alan 
 2009 - MK Ultra : Narrator
 2009 - Chop Chop... You're Dead : Thug
 2009 - The Seventh Shadow : The Mobster
 2009 - Reverie Three : Hanley Wortzik 
 2009 - This Movie Sucks : Jeremy Buckingham
 2009 - The Man Machine : Gerhard 
 2009 - God's Acre : Father 2009 - Babykiller : Debate Host
 2010 - Worm : Geoffrey Dodd
 2010 - Lavender Fields : Man

 2010 - Crossword Dreaming : Detective
 2010 - Water Babies : Philip
 2010 - Restaurant Etiquette : Brick Tomly
 2010 - Machiavelli's The Prince : Mr. Harvey
 2010 - Janus : Mark - Businessman
 2010 - Eyes Beyond : Henry Rogers
 2011 - A Date with Fear : David
 2011 - Call of Duty: Find Makarov : Soldier 3
 2011 - Stealin' Home : Officer Finley
 2011 - Call of Duty: Operation Kingfish : Helicopter Pilot (voice)
 2011 - Daddy's Little Girl : Michael 
 2011 - The Devil Walks Among You : The Tall Man
 2011 - Teach'er : Professor
 2011 - Symbiosis : Roy
 2011 - Stereography Experiment No.1 : Dominic
 2011 - Roachfar : Mr. Smith 
 2012 - Familiar : John Dodd 
 2012 - Your Sample, Please
 2012 - Eviction : Father Grimes
 2012 - The Rising Cost of Medicine : Doctor
 2013 - Killing Love : Driver
 2013 - Dead All Night : Officer #1
 2014 - The Resurrections of Clarence Neveldine : Dr. Elliott Fleming 
 2014 - Playground Rules : Warren Gabriel

 Animated films 
 2009 - Archon Defender : Alan / Soldats d'Echelon / Garde d'Echelon

 Television 

 TV films 
 2010 - Red: Werewolf Hunter : Homme du Moyen Âge (Middle Age Man)
 2012 - The Real Inglorious Bastards : Walter Guettner / Narrateur (voix)

 TV series 
 2007 - Zero Hour : Don McCormack (Épisode S3E04)
 2007 - Life or Death : Dr. ND #1 (Épisode 2 "Brain Attack")
 2009 - Psychic Investigators : Laborentin (Lab Technician, Épisode S3E13)
 2010 - Outlaw Bikers : Hilmaire Sousmire (Épisode 9 "Fallen Angels")
 2010 - Breakout : John Moriarty (Épisode S1E01)
 2011-2012 - Paranormal Witness : Électricien (Épisode S1E04) & Rob Graves (Épisode S2E09)
 2012 - Motives & Murders: Cracking the Case : Gordon Rondeau (Épisode S1E09)
 2013 - Breakout : Rondell Reed (Épisode S2E07)
 2013 - Surviving Evil : Michael Holsapple  (Épisode S2E02)

 Internet 

 Web series 
 2011–present - Out With Dad : Steven LeMay
 2011 - Dominion: The Web Series : Trevor 
 2012-2013 - Out of Time : Dr. Harold Osborn
 2013 - Gay Nerds : Rendez-vous mystère (Mystery Date, Épisode S1E04)
 2013-2014 - Improbabilia : Dr. Snowdon
 2013-2014 - Pete Winning and the Pirates : Remy
 2015 - Haphead : Patron (Boss)

 Awards and nominations 
He was nominated and received the following awards:

 2012 
LA Web Series Festival 2012 (prix multiples dans la même catégorie)
 Awards = Outstanding Ensemble Cast in a Drama for " Out with Dad " :
 Kate Conway, Will Conlon, Lindsey Middleton, Corey Lof, Laura Jabalee, Darryl Dinn, Jacob Ahearn, Wendy Glazier, Robert Nolan.

Academy of WebTelevision Awards 
 Nomination : Best Ensemble Performance for " Out with Dad "

 2014 
5th Indie Soap Awards (2014) (1 only winner in a category)
 Nominations: Best Supporting Actor, Drama for " Out with Dad "

FilmQuest Film Festival, US
 Nomination : Best Actor for " Familiar " (2012)

Queens World Film Festival
 Award : Best Actor in a Feature Film for " Mourning Has Broken " (2013)

 2015 
 Academy of WebTelevision Awards 2015
 Award : Best Ensemble Performance for " Out with Dad'' "

External links 
  (Awards)
 Out with Dad, Cast

References 

Living people
Canadian male film actors
Canadian male web series actors
Year of birth missing (living people)
21st-century Canadian male actors